Theridion incertissimum is a spider species found in French Guiana and Brazil.

See also 
 List of Theridiidae species

References

External links 

Theridiidae
Spiders described in 1954
Spiders of South America